The 1975 Delaware Fightin' Blue Hens football team represented the University of Delaware as an independent during the 1975 NCAA Division II football season. They were led by Tubby Raymond, who was in his 10th season as head coach of the Fightin' Blue Hens. The team played its home games at Delaware Stadium in Newark, Delaware. They finished the season with a record of 8–3, but failed to qualify for the postseason.

Schedule

References

Delaware
Delaware Fightin' Blue Hens football seasons
Delaware Fightin' Blue Hens football